The Admiral's Caravan  is a novel by Charles E. Carryl, written in 1891 and published by the Century Company of New York in 1892. It is one of many literary "imitations" inspired by Lewis Carroll's two books, Alice's Adventures in Wonderland (1865) and Through the Looking-Glass (1871). It appeared in serialized form in the children's periodical St Nicholas beginning in 1891.

The story is about a young girl named Dorothy who takes a journey with three wooden statues who come alive on Christmas Eve.

The book features line drawings by Reginald Bathurst Birch.

In 1885, Carryl published another book inspired by Alice's Adventures in Wonderland, called Davy and the Goblin.

Bibliography
Carryl, Charles Edward (2011) The Admiral's Caravan. Evertype.

Notes

1892 American novels
1892 fantasy novels
1890s children's books
American fantasy novels
Children's fantasy novels
American children's novels
Christmas novels
Novels first published in serial form
Works originally published in St. Nicholas Magazine
Books based on Alice in Wonderland
The Century Company books